Mott is a surname and given name.

Mott may also refer to:

Places

United States
 Mott, Missouri, a ghost town
 Mott, North Dakota, a city
 Fort Mott (New Jersey), a military fort built on the Delaware River following the American Civil War
 Fort Mott (Vermont), a picket fort used during the American Revolutionary War
 Mott Archaeological Preserve or Mott Mounds Site, an archaeological site in Franklin Parish, Louisiana
 Mott Street, Manhattan, New York
 Mott Athletic Center, a multi-purpose stadium on the campus of California Polytechnic State University, California
 Mott Bridge, a historic bridge in Oregon

Other places
 Mott Snowfield, Graham Land, Antarctica
 52291 Mott, an asteroid

Science
 Mycobacteria other than tuberculosis or nontuberculous mycobacteria 
 Nevill Mott Medal and Prize, awarded by the Institute of Physics for research in condensed matter or materials physics
 Charles S. Mott Prize, awarded annually by the General Motors Cancer Research Foundation

Entertainment
 Mott the Hoople, and English rock band that was briefly renamed "Mott" from 1974 to 1976
 Mott (album), by Mott the Hoople

Other uses
 Mott baronets, a title in the Baronetage of the United Kingdom
 Mott Community College, Flint, Michigan
 Mott School and Second Street School, Trenton, New Jersey, two former school buildings on the National Register of Historic Places
 Mott MacDonald, a civil engineering consultancy
 Mott, Hay and Anderson, a firm of consulting civil engineers – merged into Mott MacDonald

See also
 Mott's, an American company that primarily produces apple-based products
 Mott's Regiment of Militia, a unit in the American Revolutionary War
 Charles Mott-Radclyffe (1911–1992), British politician
 La Mott, Pennsylvania, an unincorporated community in the US
 Mote (disambiguation)
 Motte (disambiguation)